The canton of Clermont is an administrative division of the Oise department, northern France. Its borders were modified at the French canton reorganisation which came into effect in March 2015. Its seat is in Clermont.

It consists of the following communes:
 
Agnetz
Bailleval
Breuil-le-Sec
Breuil-le-Vert
Catenoy
Clermont
Erquery
Étouy
Fitz-James
Fouilleuse
Labruyère
Lamécourt
Liancourt
Maimbeville
Nointel
Rantigny
Rémécourt
Rosoy
Saint-Aubin-sous-Erquery
Verderonne

References

Cantons of Oise